Phrynoidis  is a small genus of true toads, family Bufonidae. They are found in Mainland Southeast Asia and the Greater Sundas. They are sometimes known as the rough toads or river toads.

Systematics
Phrynoidis was included in Bufo until 2006. Their sister taxon is the genus Rentapia (formerly part of then polyphyletic Pedostibes).

Description
Finger tips are dilated into keratinized, bulbous tips. Supernumerary palmar tubercles are present. The fingers have basal webbing. The tadpoles have large oral disc that is as wide as the body.

Phrynoidis are terrestrial riparian habitat generalists. They lay very large egg clutches.

Species
There are two species:
 Phrynoidis asper (Gravenhorst, 1829)
 Phrynoidis juxtasper (Inger, 1964)

References

 
Amphibian genera
Amphibians of Asia
Taxa named by Leopold Fitzinger